Héctor Lavoe is a 6-foot tall bronze statue to the memory of salsa singer Héctor Lavoe who reached his professional height during the 1970s. The bronze statue is located at the sea-front recreational complex Complejo Recreativo y Cultural La Guancha in Barrio Playa, Ponce, Puerto Rico. The statue is the work of by Puerto Rican artist Severo Romero and was unveiled in 2014.

Background
Héctor Lavoe (1946 – 1993) was a Puerto Rican salsa singer. He was known as "El Cantante de los Cantantes" (The Singer of Singers). From a young age, he developed an interest in music and attended the Ponce Free School of Music, known today as the Instituto de Música Juan Morel Campos. In 1963, he moved to New York City, at the age of sixteen. Shortly after his arrival to New York City, he worked as the singer in a sextet formed by Roberto García. During this period, he also performed with several other groups, including Orquesta New York, Kako All-Stars, and the Johnny Pacheco band. In 1967, Lavoe joined Willie Colón's band as its vocalist, recording several hit songs, including "El Malo" and "Canto a Borinquen". Lavoe became a soloist and formed his own band performing as lead vocalist. As a soloist, Lavoe recorded several hits including: "El cantante", "Bandolera" and "Periódico de ayer". He was frequently featured as a guest singer with the Fania All Stars, recording numerous tracks with the band. In 2000, he was inducted into the International Latin Music Hall of Fame.

Description
The idea of creating a statue to his honor started since 2002, when the remains of the singer were moved to Ponce to be interred at Cementerio Civil de Ponce. A "Comité Pro Monumento a Héctor Lavoe" (Committee Pro Hector Lavoe Monument) was created to head the planning and building effort and donations were received. The bulk of the money for the statue came from donations from $1 to $20 given by the public at large. It was unveiled on 1 June 2014.

The statue is the product of the Puerto Rican sculptor from Ponce, Severo Romero. It was built at a cost of $60,000. Its height is 2 meters and it weighs 1 ton. The statue presents the singer with a microphone on his right hand and a pair of maracas on his left hand. Artistically, the sculpture is a true-life depiction of the subject measuring, for example, six feet high. It is made in bronze.

References

External links

 Estructuras y Monumentos en Puerto Rico.

2014 establishments in Puerto Rico
2014 sculptures
Buildings and structures in Ponce, Puerto Rico
Monuments and memorials in Ponce, Puerto Rico
Public art in Puerto Rico
Sculptures of men in Puerto Rico
Statues in Ponce, Puerto Rico
Cultural depictions of Puerto Rican people